Joannes Disma Floriantschitsch de Grienfeld (Slovenized as Ivan or Janez Dizma Florjančič de Grienfeld; July 1, 1691 – 1757) was a Carniolan astronomer, mathematician, geographer, and cartographer.

Life and work
Floriantschitsch de Grienfeld was born in Ljubljana. He served in a series of important church functions, finishing his career in 1757 as the archdeacon of Stična Abbey. In 1744, he published the first map of Carniola, titled Ducatus Carnioliae Tabula Chorographica (Chorographic Map of the Duchy of Carniola) at a scale of 1:111,000. He also wrote a book on gnomonics and a work on measuring time, and built his own observatory. From his writings it is clear that he was familiar with the methods of astronomy at the time. His two Latin manuscripts, which are held by the National and University Library of Slovenia in Ljubljana, preserve many essays on astronomy and mathematics, tables with instructions for making astronomical calculations, tables and a theory about the movement of the Sun and to some extent also the Moon and the planets for the Gregorian calendar for the Ljubljana meridian, a geometry manual, writings about squaring the circle, and his own observations on the Sun and Moon.

References

External links
Glonar Joža. 1926. Floriantschitsch de Grienfeld, Ivan Dizma. Slovenski bijografski leksikon, vol. 2, Erberg–Hinterlechner. Ljubljana: Zadružna gospodarska banka.

Carniolan astronomers
Carniolan mathematicians
Carniolan geographers
Carniolan cartographers
Carniolan Roman Catholic priests
Cistercians